Lake View Cemetery is a garden cemetery in Cleveland, Ohio.

Lake View Cemetery or Lakeview Cemetery may also refer to:

in Canada
 Lakeview Cemetery, Sarnia, Ontario, Canada

in the United States
 Lake View Cemetery (Brockport, New York), listed on U.S. National Register of Historic Places (NRHP)
 Lake View Cemetery (Ithaca, New York), burial place of Carl Sagan
 Lake View Cemetery (Penn Yan, New York), NRHP-listed
 Lakeview Cemetery (Richfield Springs, New York), burial place of Augustus R. Elwood
Lakeview Cemetery (Skaneateles, New York), NRHP-listed in Onondaga County
 Lakeview Cemetery (Galveston, Texas)
 Lake View Cemetery (Seattle), Washington
 Lake View Cemetery (Eau Claire, Wisconsin) in Eau Claire, Wisconsin, burial place of George B. Shaw